Miguel Davis García (born 18 June 1966) is a Costa Rican former football defender who was selected by Costa Rica for the 1990 FIFA World Cup.

Club career
The long-haired and moustached Davis started his career at Alajuelense, with whom he won the 1991 league title, and also played for Turrialba, Carmelita and Cartaginés, whom he joined in summer 1995. In summer 1998 he moved to Limón.

His career was troubled due to alcohol abuse.

International career
Davis was a non-playing squad member at the 1990 FIFA World Cup and played in 1 FIFA World Cup qualification match.

His final international was a December 1994 friendly match against Saudi Arabia.

International goals
Scores and results list Costa Rica's goal tally first.

References

External links
 

1966 births
Living people
Association football defenders
Costa Rican men's footballers
Costa Rica international footballers
1990 FIFA World Cup players
L.D. Alajuelense footballers
A.D. Carmelita footballers
C.S. Cartaginés players
Liga FPD players